The 1999 Internationaux de Strasbourg singles was the tennis singles event of the thirteenth edition of the Internationaux de Strasbourg, a WTA Tier III tournament held in Strasbourg, France and part of the European clay court season. Alexandra Fusai and Nathalie Tauziat were the defending champions, but they were defeated in the final by Elena Likhovtseva and Ai Sugiyama, 2–6, 7–6(8–6), 6–1.

Seeds

Draw

Qualifying

External links
 1999 Internationaux de Strasbourg Doubles Qualifying Draw
 1999 Internationaux de Strasbourg Doubles Draw

1999
Internationaux de Strasbourg
1999 in French tennis